Tomislav Pucar (born 26 January 1996) is a Croatian table tennis player. In February 2017 he won the men's singles title at the inaugural European Under-21 Championships in Sochi.

As of 2018, Pucar is playing for TTC RhönSprudel Fulda-Maberzel in the German Bundesliga. From 2022 Pucar Is playing for Apuania Carrara Tennistavolo in the  Italian Serie A1.



Career records
Senior career highlights, as of April 2018:

Singles

World Championships: Round of 128 (2017), Round of 16 (2019)
ITTF World Tour:
QF: 2014 Croatia Open
Last 16: 2015 Bulgarian Open, 2017 Qatar Open
European Championships: Last 64 (2016)

Men's doubles

World Championships: Last 64 (2017)
ITTF World Tour: 
Last 16: 2016 Croatia Open, 2017 Swedish Open
European Championships: Last 32 (2016)

Mixed doubles

World Championships: Last 64 (2015)

Team

World Team Championships: Last 12 (2016, 2018)
European Championships: SF (2014); QF (2017); Last 16 (2015)
European Games: Last 16 (2015)

References

Croatian male table tennis players
1996 births
Sportspeople from Pula
Living people
Olympiacos Table Tennis players
Table tennis players at the 2015 European Games
Table tennis players at the 2019 European Games
European Games medalists in table tennis
European Games bronze medalists for Croatia
Table tennis players at the 2020 Summer Olympics
Olympic table tennis players of Croatia
20th-century Croatian people
21st-century Croatian people